Midnight Control is the eighth studio studio album by American reggae/rock/rap hybrid band Dirty Heads. The album was released on August 26, 2022. 

The album features cover art created by bassist David Foral and 2 singles; "Life's Been Good" (Joe Walsh cover) and "Heavy Water" with Grammy Award-nominated band Common Kings. "Heavy Water" is a song about empowerment", Jared Watson shared. "Being in the water constantly from a young age, we know the power of the ocean. There is nothing more powerful or uncontrollable. 'Heavy Water' is a metaphor for life because when life throws something at you that's unforeseen and uncontrollable, you will be ready for it and not let it overtake you." Jared also spoke about the meaning behind and the making of Midnight Control. "The album is the culmination of almost twenty years of musical exploration, creativity, and our love for creating original impactful art and music. It's the best album we've ever written, and I think that's due to the fact we have been through so much, done so much, and are comfortable as songwriters, producers, players and human beings."

Track listing

Charts

Singles

References

2017 albums
Dirty Heads albums
Five Seven Music albums